Horsham Town Hall is a municipal building in the Market Square in Horsham, West Sussex. It is a Grade II listed building.

History
The earliest mention of a building on the site was when a structure referred to as the "Market House", which contained a supply of arms, was seized during an uprising by a group of some 600 royalists in 1648 during the English Civil War; the revolt was put down by Sir Michael Livesey and his parliamentary troops.

A new building of Portland Stone financed by Arthur Ingram, 6th Viscount of Irvine and containing a poultry and butter market was completed in 1712. The building fell into disrepair and was substantially rebuilt with funding from Charles Howard, 11th Duke of Norfolk in 1812. Although the facade was retained, it was largely rebuilt again with support from Henry Fitzalan-Howard, 15th Duke of Norfolk in 1888. It was originally used as a facility for dispensing justice and a meeting place for the local town council but, following the implementation of the Local Government Act 1888, which established county councils in every county, it also became the meeting place of West Sussex County Council.

After the County Council moved to Edes House in Chichester in 1916, the Old Town Hall continued to be used as a courthouse and, for a while, was used as a meeting place for Horsham Urban District Council. However Horsham Urban District Council bought Horsham Park House and grounds and began using the house as their council offices from 1928.

Important trials in the court house including the initial stages of the trial of John Haigh, commonly known as the Acid Bath Murderer, who murdered six people and disposed of their bodies using sulphuric acid; he was committed for trial at Lewes Assizes in April 1949. The Town Hall ceased to be used as a courthouse after the new law courts opened in Hurst Road in 1974. More recently the upper floor of the Town Hall has housed the Local Registry Office and the ground floor was used as an occasional flea market until it was let as a restaurant.

References

Grade II listed buildings in West Sussex
City and town halls in West Sussex
Government buildings completed in 1812
Horsham